Prodikeys is a music and computer keyboard combination. It is created by Singaporean audio company Creative Technology. So far there have been 3 different versions of Prodikeys: Creative Prodikeys, Creative Prodikeys DM and Creative Prodikeys PC-MIDI. It has 37 mini-sized music keys under detachable palm cover and comes with Prodikeys software. The MIDI keyboard can also be used as a MIDI controller for third-party MIDI software. It is compatible with Windows XP, 2000, and Linux, but is incompatible with Windows Vista, 7, 8, and Mac OS X.

Included Software:

EasyNotes
Learn to play any song melody on own - from the included song library or downloaded MIDI files of favourite pop tunes from the Internet. EasyNotes supports music format in SEQ and MIDI.

FunMix
Can create and record own music with pre-arranged mixes and personalize own ring tone or video soundtrack easily.

HotKeys Manager
It lets customize the keyboard's hotkeys functions for easy access to the software suite.

Mini Keyboard
Will be able to explore with more than a hundred different instrument sounds - including piano, flute, guitar and drums.

Prodikeys Launcher
Can use it to launch the software and the Product Tutorial for an interactive demo.

Prodikeys DM
The Prodikeys DM does not use USB, but rather has one single Mini-DIN connector for the PS/2 port and is therefore detected as a regular typing keyboard. The included Windows software communicates with the keyboard driver in order to send and receive MIDI data over the PS/2 line. This protocol has been partly reverse-engineered, making it possible to use the Prodikeys DM on a regular USB port using an Arduino microcontroller as an adaptor.

References

Singaporean brands
Keyboard instruments
Computer keyboards